The Workers' Liberation Front (FOL), officially the 30th of May Workers' Liberation Front Party, is a social-democratic populist political party in Curaçao founded in 1969. The party participated in the general elections for the Curaçao constituency in the Estates of the Netherlands Antilles and the Curaçao Island council until the dissolution of the Netherlands Antilles in 2010. After losing its seat in the Estates of Curaçao following the 2012 Curaçao general election, the party is not represented anymore in the Curaçao legislature.

Netherlands Antilles
The party was founded in 1969 and named after the riots/uprising of 30 May. When Wilson Godett and Stanley Brown were elected in the Estates of the Netherlands Antilles, they were still in jail for their connections with the riots; but their upcoming membership in the Estates set them free. During the 2002 and 2006 elections respectively, the party won 5 and 2 of the 14 Curaçao-seats in the 22 seat Estates of the Netherlands Antilles, but during the 2010 election the party failed to obtain any seats.

In 2003, the party obtained eight seats and became the largest party in the 21-seat island council (with 34% of the vote), dropping to 2 seats in 2007. The party delivered two prime-ministers of the Netherlands Antilles: Ben Komproe and Mirna Louisa-Godett. The latter was only appointed as Governor Frits Goedgedrag refused to inaugurate her brother (and son of Wilson Godett) . The single seat the party obtained in the Island council election of 2010 (held by Anthony Godett) automatically became a seat in the Estates of Curaçao upon the Dissolution of the Netherlands Antilles in 2010.

Election results 
During the elections of 2012, the party participated in the elections, obtaining 1,790 votes (2.1%). This was not enough for a seat. 
The party participated in order to qualify for participating in the elections in 2016 and 2017, in which it needed to obtain 870 and 792 votes respectively (1% of the turnout in the previous elections). The party did not manage to do so in 2016 (with 622 votes), but in 2017 it did, in a joint list with Partido Aliansa Nobo (1,124 votes). It did not obtain a seat in the parliament in the 2017 elections.

Candidates

References

Political parties in Curaçao
Political parties established in 1969
1969 establishments in the Netherlands Antilles
Social democratic parties in the Netherlands
Populism in the Netherlands